Šemsudin Gegić (born in 1951 in Zavidovici, Bosnia and Herzegovina), is Bosnian literate, playwright, theater, television and film director.

Biography
He graduated from the  University of Arts/Academy of Dramatic Arts (theatre, film, radio and television) in Belgrade in the former Yugoslavia. He received a year-long specialization in directing in 1995 in Milan (Italy) supported by a fellowship provided by the Television of Bosnia and Herzegovina.

Šemsudin Gegić is the author and director of an additional ten documentary and feature films, writer and director of the first performance of seven original stage plays, author and director of thirty documentary and documentary-feature films for which he won domestic and international plaudits and awards.

Awards and honors
He is a winner of a great number of domestic and international awards for his work in the field of drama and his documentary films:

Award for the Art in recording "Without Retake" for the best documentary feature "Tracing the Shadows", Bulgaria, 2009
Maxi man - 2008, in category of Drama Art, Sarajevo, 2008
Camera veritas for the Best Documentary – “Ambassadors learning languages”, Plovdiv, Bulgaria, 2008
Golden Art Amphora for the Best Documentary –“A Boy from a War movie”, Sophia, Bulgaria, 2004
First Special Award Napolidrammaturgiain Festival for the Best Drama “La Dote”, Napoli, Italy, 2002
Special Award of the International Jury of the VI Sarajevo Film Festival for the “Following the Footprints of Shadows”, Sarajevo, Bosnia and Herzegovina, 2000
Scena Prima Award for the best play “La Sibilla di Sarajevo”, Lombardia, Italy, 1996
Annual Award of the BiH Journalist Association for TV documentary enterprise of the year, Sarajevo, Bosnia and Herzegovina, 1992
Finalist of the three best documentary radio dramas with documentary drama – “Album of a Man of the People”, RTV Festival Prix Italy, Cagliari, Italy, 1985
Isak Samokovlija Literary Award for the Best Drama “Ruho”, Competition MRZ for the Cultural and Educational Work, Pljevlja, Ex-Yugoslavia, 1984

Sources
http://www.unaff.org/2008/f_ambassadors.html
http://www.filmfestival-goeast.de/index.php?article_id=176&clang=1&mode=film&event_id=1942

References

External links
http://www.bhfilm.ba/
http://www.narodno-mostar.info/
http://www.adu.untz.ba/

1951 births
People from Zavidovići
Living people